Teodor Vaso (born 15 September 1941) is an Albanian footballer. He played in nine matches for the Albania national football team from 1967 to 1971.

References

External links
 

1941 births
Living people
Albanian footballers
Albania international footballers
Place of birth missing (living people)
Association footballers not categorized by position